Martín Michel (born 5 September 1994) is a Bolivian judoka.

He competed at the 2016 Summer Olympics in Rio de Janeiro, in the men's 90 kg. He was defeated by Asley González in the first round.

References

1994 births
Living people
Bolivian male judoka
Olympic judoka of Bolivia
Judoka at the 2016 Summer Olympics